Urophora coronata is a species of tephritid or fruit flies in the genus Urophora of the family Tephritidae.

Distribution
Russia.

References

Urophora
Insects described in 1990
Diptera of Europe